Collagen alpha-5(VI) chain also known as von Willebrand factor A domain-containing protein 4 is a protein that in humans is encoded by the COL6A5 gene.

COL6A5 is a part of the Collagen VI gene family which produce collagen components for the Extracellular matrix of most connective tissues. In the human genome, part of the collagen VI family is located on chromosome 3q in order of COL6A4, COL6A5, COL6A6. Transcription of COL6A5 only occurs in skin, lung, testis, colon, and small intestine cells.

References

Collagens